Irrigon Junior/Senior High School is a public high school in Irrigon, Oregon, United States. The school is most known for its 2014 and 2015 men's basketball team, who went back to back in state championships in the 2A league.

Academics
In 2008, 95% of the school's seniors received their high school diploma. Of 56 students, 53 graduated, two dropped out, and one was still in high school the following year.

References

High schools in Morrow County, Oregon
Public middle schools in Oregon
Education in Morrow County, Oregon
Public high schools in Oregon